Kalpadukal is a 1962 Malayalam-language film, directed by K. S. Antony, starring Prem Nazir in the lead role. The film received a certificate of merit at the National Film Awards. Renowned playback singer K. J. Yesudas sang his first song for this film.

Awards
National Film Awards
 1962: Certificate of Merit for the Second Best Feature Film in Malayalam

Cast

 Prem Nazir
 Prem Nawas
 Ragini
 Aranmula Ponnamma
 Nellikode Bhaskaran
 P. J. Antony
 Paravoor Bharathan
 Adoor Pankajam
 Sukumari
 Thrissur Elsy
 Nambiyathu
 Vishnuprasad
 Thoppil Ravi
 S. N. Puram Kunchan
 Pulivalan Kochappan
 Kollam Sukumaran
 B. Krishna
 Vasumathi
 Thara
 Raphael
 Kalamandalam Bhanumathi
 Artist Nandan
 Sivasankaran
 U. C. K. Vadanappilli
 T. K. Shanthi
 Ponnara Vijayan
 Master Shanavas
 K. C. Rajasekharan
 K. P. Paul
 Johnson
 Sreedharan
 Parvathiyamma
 M. N. Damodaran
 Dharmaraj
 Antony Jose

Soundtrack 
The music was composed by M. B. Sreenivasan and lyrics were written by P. Bhaskaran, Kumaranasan, Sreenarayana Guru and Nambiyathu.

References

External links
http://www.malayalachalachithram.com/movie.php?i=94
 

1962 films
1960s Malayalam-language films